Murambinda is a town in Zimbabwe.

Location
It is located in Buhera District, Manicaland Province, in eastern Zimbabwe. The coordinates of Murambinda are: 19° 16' 12.00"S, 31° 39' 0.00"E (Latitude:-19.2700; Longitude:31.6500).

Overview
The town of Murambinda is one of the only two designated urban areas in Buhera District; the other being Birchenough Bridge. There is a school in town, Murambinda School, and a missionary hospital, Murambinda Mission Hospital (MMH), both administered by the Sisters of the Little Company of Mary, under the auspices of the Roman Catholic Archdiocese of Harare.
The hospital, founded in 1968, also functions as the District Hospital for the nearly 300,000 district inhabitants. There is a nurses training school, affiliated with MMH, adjacent to the hospital.

History
The town is sometimes referred to as Murambinda Growth Point. "Growth Points" are centres that have been set aside and are subsidised by government, to develop urban centers in predominantly rural settings. The Growth Points are expected to establish urban residential areas, small and medium enterprises (SMEs), and light industry.

Population
The current population of Murambinda is not publicly known. In 2004, the population of the town was estimated at 3,383 people. The next national census in Zimbabwe is scheduled from 18 August 2012 through 28 August 2012.

Notable People from Murambinda
Mugove Machaka (Computer Programmer) LinkedIn
 Farai .S. Ndawana (Big Data Principal Architect)
 Bianca Bondayi
 Zivai Mupambirei
 Purpose Makanyisa

See also
 Districts of Zimbabwe
 Provinces of Zimbabwe
 Geography of Zimbabwe

References

Populated places in Manicaland Province
Buhera District